Bonneau Beach is a census-designated place (CDP) in Berkeley County, South Carolina, United States. The population was 1,929 at the 2010 census. It is located on the shore of Lake Moultrie.

Demographics

References

Census-designated places in Berkeley County, South Carolina